Heinrich Friedrich Wilhelm Seidel (25 June 1842, Perlin, Mecklenburg-Schwerin – 7 November 1906, Berlin) was a German engineer, poet and writer.

Life

Seidel was the son of a pastor and studied in the Polytechnikum in Hannover from 1860 to 1862 and in the Gewerbeakademie in Berlin, becoming an engineer. Beginning in 1866 he participated in the construction of the Anhalter Bahnhof railway station in Berlin, where he was the first to achieve the construction of its main hall roof with a free span of 62,5 m. However, in 1880 he gave up the profession to dedicate himself to writing the children's stories and fairy tales for which he is chiefly remembered today.

In Berlin, Heinrich Seidel became a member of the Hütte Academic Association "A.V. Hütte" and the literary society Tunnel über der Spree. Under the pseudonym Johannes Köhnke he collaborated with Julius Stinde (pseudonym Theophil Ballheim), Johannes Trojan and others in the Allgemeiner Deutscher Reimverein (ADR), where he demonstrated his skill as a Reimakrobat (rhyme acrobat).

The famous catchphrase "Dem Ingenieur ist nichts zu schwer" (to an engineer nothing is too difficult) was his personal motto and the first line of his writing Ingenieurlied (Song of an Engineer).

 
He is interred at the Berlin's Lichterfelde cemetery.

Works 

Aus der Heimat, Novellen, 1874
Vorstadtgeschichten, 1880
Leberecht Hühnchen, Jorinde und andere Geschichten, 1882
Im Jahre 1984, 1884
Neues von Leberecht Hühnchen und anderen Sonderlingen, 1888
Natursänger, 1888
Leberecht Hühnchen als Großvater, 1890
Sonderbare Geschichten, 1891
Von Perlin nach Berlin, Lebenserinnerungen, 1894 (new edition 2006)
Glockenspiel, VII.Band Gesammelte Schriften, 1897
Wintermärchen, XVI.Band Gesammelte Schriften, 1901
Leberecht Hühnchen (Gesamtausgabe), 1901
Heimatgeschichten (Gesamtausgabe), 1902
Reinhard Flemmings Abenteuer zu Wasser und zu Lande (3 Bde.), 1900–1906
Ingenieurlied

References 

Text of this article initially translated from article on German Wikipedia.
Christian Ferber: Die Seidels, Geschichte einer bürgerlichen Familie 1811–1977. Stuttgart: DVA 1979 – Christian Ferber is a pseudonym for Georg Seidel, b. 1919, the son of Heinrich Wolfgang Seidel and Ina Seidel.
Friedrich Mülder: Heinrich Seidel. ...Wie er ein Poet und Ingenieur gewesen... Ein Lebensbild. Hamburg: Von Bockel 1997. (= Schriftenreihe Mecklenburger Profile; 3)

External links 
 
 
  Texte von Heinrich Seidel (Projekt Gutenberg-DE) 
 Heinrich Seidel in der Chronik der HÜTTE
   Alfred Biese: Kurze Autobiographie
  Kurzbiografie zu Heinrich Seidel
 Über "Leberecht Hühnchen"

1842 births
1906 deaths
German poets
Engineers from Mecklenburg-Western Pomerania
People from the Grand Duchy of Mecklenburg-Schwerin
German male poets
19th-century poets
19th-century German writers
19th-century German male writers
People from Nordwestmecklenburg